Johannes Hendricus Simon "Jan" van Ruiten (23 March 1931 – 26 September 2016) was a Dutch businessman and politician. He served in the House of Representatives for the Pim Fortuyn List (LPF) from 23 May 2002, until 30 January 2003.

Career
Van Ruiten was born in Gouda on 23 March 1931. He studied to become a merchant navy officer and worked in the maritime sector until 1960. He then held jobs as export employee, purchaser, and sales manager. Between 1971 and 1991, he was director of several companies. He was a member of the House of Representatives for the Pim Fortuyn List (LPF) from 23 May 2002, until 30 January 2003. In October 2002, he was elected second deputy parliamentary group leader. During his time in the House van Ruiten was one of three LPF members over 65 years old, in a time when this was quite rare.

Van Ruiten was an Officer of the Order of Orange-Nassau. He died in Sneek on 26 September 2016.

References

External links
  Parlement.com biography

1931 births
2016 deaths
Dutch businesspeople
Members of the House of Representatives (Netherlands)
Officers of the Order of Orange-Nassau
People from Gouda, South Holland
Pim Fortuyn List politicians
21st-century Dutch politicians